Defence Scheme No. 1 was a war plan created by Canadian Director of Military Operations and Intelligence Lieutenant Colonel James "Buster" Sutherland Brown, for a Canadian pre-emptive attack against the United States in the (hypothetical) case of a conflict between the United States and the British Empire.

Targets
Defence Scheme No. 1 was created on April 12, 1921, and detailed a surprise invasion of the northern United States as soon as possible after evidence was received of a US invasion of Canada. It assumed that the US would first attempt to capture Montreal and Ottawa and then Hamilton, Toronto, the Prairie Provinces, and Vancouver and the rest of Southwestern British Columbia. Defence Scheme No. 1's US counterpart was War Plan Red, a plan to invade Canada as part of a war with Britain that was created in 1930.

The purpose of invading the US was to allow time for Canada to prepare its war effort and to receive aid from Britain. According to the plan, Canadian flying columns stationed in Pacific Command in western Canada would immediately be sent to seize Seattle, Spokane, and Portland. Troops stationed in Prairie Command would attack Fargo and Great Falls, then advance towards Minneapolis. Troops from Quebec would be sent to seize Albany in a surprise counterattack while troops from the Maritime Provinces would invade Maine. When resistance grew, the Canadian soldiers would retreat to their own borders, destroying bridges and railways to delay US military pursuit.

Reconnaissance
Brown himself did reconnaissance for the plan, along with other lieutenant-colonels, all in plainclothes, from 1921 to 1926.  As historian Pierre Berton noted in his book Marching As to War, the investigation had "a zany flavour about it, reminiscent of the silent comedies of the day." To illustrate that, Berton quoted from Brown's reports, in which Brown recorded, among other things, that in Burlington, Vermont, the people were "affable" and thus unusual for Americans; that Americans drink significantly less alcohol than Canadians (it was during Prohibition), and that upon pointing that out to Americans, one responded, "My God! I'd go for a glass of beer. I'm going to 'Canady' to get some more"; that the people of Vermont would be serious soldiers only "if aroused"; and that many people in the US might be sympathetic with the British cause.

Reaction
Despite Berton's description of the plan and its creator as "quixotic", Berton notes the plan had its supporters, such as General George Pearkes, who remarked that Defence Scheme No. 1 was a "fantastic desperate plan [which] just might have worked."

Christopher M. Bell, however, criticized the plan as "suicidal". Since Brown did not coordinate with the British, he did not know that the British military had no plans to send a large army to Canada on the grounds of not being able to defend its territory against the much larger United States. His plan would thus have sacrificed the best Canadian troops for no reason. Brown also did not understand the importance of keeping Halifax, Nova Scotia, one of the main targets of a US invasion, and other Atlantic ports open. Bell states that Canada's best strategy would have been, as the Americans expected, to engage in a defensive war.

In 1928, Defence Scheme No. 1 was terminated by Chief of the General Staff Andrew McNaughton, who sought peaceful US–British relations. Many of the documents relating to the scheme were accordingly destroyed.

See also
Canada–United States relations
Defence Scheme No. 2

References

Books

Berton, Pierre.  Marching as to War:  Canada's Turbulent Years 1899-1953.  Anchor Canada:  2002.
Harris, Steven, Canadian Brass: The Making of a Professional Army, 1860-1939. Toronto: University of Toronto Press, 1988. Includes a section on the interwar defence planning.
Preston, Richard A. The Defence of the Undefended Border: Planning for War in North America 1867-1939. Montreal and London: McGill-Queen's University Press, 1977.

External links
 Excerpt from Canadian Defence Scheme No. 1 (See End of Article)
 "Raiding the Icebox" The Washington Post. December 30, 2005
 

1921 establishments in Canada
1928 disestablishments in Canada
Canada–United States relations
Military history of Canada
Military plans
Invasions of the United States